is a Japanese adult yuri visual novel series created by the dōjin group Fuguriya. The series debuted on November 25, 2006, with a visual novel of the same name for Microsoft Windows. Since then, a total of 23 titles have been released, with the most recent one being released on October 26, 2016. Following the success of the first game, it expanded into a series of visual novels, light novels, drama CDs, radio shows, artbooks and an anime adaptation.

Plot
Set in St. Michael's Academy (Mikajyo), the game follows the relationships and romance between various girls. While a majority of the games focus just on a single couple, some of the newer titles feature multiple couples.

Series differences
The uniforms for the high school students are auburn, with a white sailor collar, and a black bow tie, while the uniforms for the middle school students are light pink, also with a white sailor collar, and a red bow tie; the uniforms for the Next Generation series are white, with a black sailor collar (complete with a matching black skirt), and a red bow tie as well.

Characters

Main series

 Nanami is a first-year high school student at St. Michael's Academy. Her head is full of romantic feelings for Yūna. She is stubborn and involved in trifling arguments, even with her partner. Nanami is of such a lovestruck disposition that her discovery that Yūna is actually nothing like how she initially imagined her only caused her to fall harder for her.

 A second-year high school student at St. Michael's and chairman of the Environmental Protection Committee (a group that is functionally the student council), she is also the proud daughter of wealthy parents who are the directors of large hospitals all over Japan. Yūna is a somewhat soft-spoken intellectual beauty with a gentle disposition, with a natural gift for sports. She is a campus idol, naturally adored by her juniors and seniors alike, although she seems completely oblivious. However, Yūna is actually a rather spoilt, dirty-minded girl, especially when it comes to her girlfriend, Nanami. Yūna will not be satisfied unless she puts all her heart and soul into something.

Reo is a second-year student and classmate of Mai Sawaguchi. She is socially inept, has a fear of strangers, and is known to have a very short stature. However, she acts like a wild beast, being depicted as a traditional tsundere character. Because both of her parents are living overseas, she lives alone in a big apartment.

Mai is one of Reo's classmates, who grew up studying at St. Michael's Academy, having attended since kindergarten. Similarly, to her sister, she perceives herself as a "commoner", albeit having spent so much time at St. Michael's Academy. She has two younger siblings: a brother and a sister.

 A second-year student at St. Michael's Academy and a childhood friend of Mai, Kaede is a talented girl who serves as class representative. Although meek and subdued by nature, she has a strong sense of duty, and her classmates have complete confidence in her. She and her cousin Sara are an "officially recognized" couple on campus.

A first-year student at St. Michael's and Kaede's cousin who is well-known from fashion magazines. Her mother is an actress, making Sara a true thoroughbred. Sara has a charismatic temperament that causes her to unwittingly charm those around her. Her affection for Kaede is in full overdrive, both publicly and privately.

 Runa is a recent transfer student to St. Michael's Middle School and Takako's lover. She is dominant, has the disposition of a queen, speaks and carries herself like an adult, and has everyone around her wrapped around her little finger. Rather than impulsively losing her temper when it comes to Takako, she seems more likely to quietly threaten. Since her parents' whereabouts are unknown, Runa previously lived with her sister in a large apartment until she moved in with her teacher.

Takako is one of the teachers in the elementary department at St. Michael's Christian School. When Takako was a child, she was a shy young schoolgirl who had an innocent crush on her senpai, Rena. She is currently living with Runa, and tries to teach her to act more childish. Before meeting Rena, she lived with her parents and brother.

 Miya is a student in Year 1's "Snow" class and a classmate of Risa. Though she is a prominent genius on campus, she struggles in social interactions and hates socializing with others. Miya rarely shows her soft side, but when she does, she adopts a somewhat timid demeanor. Miya has been offered the chance to study abroad and has even skipped grades.

Risa is the class representative of Year 1's "Snow" class, and a classmate of Miya. She is the half-Japanese daughter of a foreign company.

Rikka is a first-year student at Saint Michael's Academy, who was admitted from outside the school system on a scholarship. Rikka cannot help but intervene whenever she sees someone in trouble, which has made her extremely popular. Serving as Vice Class Representative, she and Class Representative Sayuki were voted as a Best Couple. Owing to her dependable nature, she is come to be known as "Snow White's Knight".

Sayuki is Rikka's fellow classmate. Besides being beautiful and brilliant, she is a talented scholar and athlete who was selected to serve on the Environmental Preservation Committee. Holding such a resounding reputation since middle school, she's being hailed as the first "Ultimate Lady" since the days of alumna Rena Hōraisen. Her grandfather is descended from samurai who are rumoured to have owned a castle, so owing to her name, she has earned the nickname "Snow White".

Eris is an exchange student at St. Michael's Junior College from Russia. She is proficient in Japanese and was formerly the famed proprietor of the "Lily Platinum Fan Club." She is doing a homestay with Shizuku's family while the two of them attend junior college. Eris still makes Shizuku turn briefly tsundere whenever she speaks passionate words of love to her, with no regard for who might be listening. She has a strong rivalry with Reo.

Shizuku is a third-year student and Japanese beauty who has grown up at St. Michael's Academy. Born to a calligrapher father, Shizuku is highly regarded as "Shizuku-gozen," the scribe of St. Michael's. She is in an openly public relationship with Eris, the former exchange student, and the two of them attend St. Michael's Junior College together.

Rena is one of the schoolteachers at St. Michael's who has a likeable personality. At the time, she was an alumna of St. Michael's Junior College, and both teachers and students respected her for being a well-behaved young lady.

The current school principal at St. Michael's Academy's name is never revealed. She was one of Takako's former schoolteachers when the latter was a St. Michael's student.

Angels series

A pushy and overprotective girl who is in her first year of nursing school, Yuno is Satsuki's classmate and dorm mate. Fairly protective, she always speaks formally, with deference to others.

Satsuki is a frank and aloof girl with boyish tendencies. Although she never had much interest in eating, Yuuno has been using her home cooking to draw her out more so that Satsuki would be more straightforward with her expressions of affection, regardless of their surroundings. She also makes an appearance in Yuririn.

Ringo is a first-year student in nursing school and a graduate of St. Michael's. She is friends with Chiaki, who admired her since they were little. Taking her acceptance to nursing school as an opportunity to become independent from her parents, she lives with Chiaki in her apartment.

A seemingly perfect nurse who is actually somewhat spoiled. She is a nurse in the gastrointestinal surgery ward at Saint Michael's General Hospital.

New Generation series

A second-year middle school student who transferred from public school, she and Ai are identical twin sisters, but they have been separated since birth and got together since just half a year ago. With a bright and cheerful disposition, Aya has a submissive streak. She has romantic and sexual feelings for her sister, Ai, but she tries to avoid making them a couple, as she is worried that her parents will be troubled by a "wrong" relationship.

Aya's older twin sister, and the class mascot Although meek and docile, Ai is in fact willful and childish and won't budge once she sets her mind on something. She was kidnapped by the same person that kidnapped Aya, but was immediately turned over to her parents after she and Aya finished playing in the park near the place Aya was raised. She used to be an honor student before Aya transferred in, which worries Aya herself.

Hazuki is a clumsy transfer student who was admitted in the second term at the annex school. She makes no attempts to hide her humble roots. She would sometimes make silly expressions and only notice them after the incident was already over. She is well-liked by everyone in school. She is Manami's lover.

Manami is a sheltered teenage girl with an air of grace and refinement. Her true personality comes out through her internet idol persona "Mana" (マナ), where she appears cruel and abusive. She is the lover of Hazuki. She is considered cruel but always true to others. She would rather be a commoner.

Nagisa is the star of the school's track and field team. She and Rina have been friends, since childhood. While she is observant on the outside, even trying to evade being kissed by Rina in public, when they are in private, she can be somewhat aggressive.

Rina is a spoiled and pushy girl who has a particular fondness for Nagisa, always trying to flirt with her. She and Nagisa have been friends, since childhood.

Hanahira!

 Kaori, too, is a tsundere who can't be honest about her deep love for Amane. She lives next door to Amane and goes to Saint Michael's Girls Academy together. Very responsible and straightforward, she fulfills the tsukkomi role very well. However, when Amane's repeated loving advances break down her tsundere wall, she becomes somewhat lovable.

Koharu is the mascot character among the four friends. Soft-spoken and pure, she emits an "iyashi-kei" charm that captures Makoto's heart. Koharu greatly admires Makoto since she is so much more mature than her. She is a wonderful cook and very handy around the house.

Makoto is a reserved girl who dreams about being in a relationship with Koharu.

 Amane is one of the main characters in Hana Hira! She is Kaori's polar opposite, being airheaded, lively, glomping Kaori at every opportunity, and generally lazy. She fails at studying and cooking, and would rather stay up playing games than do anything else.

Media

Visual novels
The first title in the series, A Kiss for the Petals was released on November 25, 2006. As of September 2015, fifteen games and two spinoff titles have been released. The fifteenth game in the main series, Remembering How We Met, which was initially released in Japan on Android and iOS, was licensed by MangaGamer and released in English for Microsoft Windows on September 25, 2015. The eleventh game in the main series, Maidens of Michael, was released for Windows in English on February 22, 2018. It was initially available on Steam, however, in April 2018 it was delisted by Valve, ostensibly in response to a malicious false user report according to MangaGamer. It has not returned to Steam since this time, however it remains available for purchase on MangaGamer's own storefront and GOG.

Main series

Angels series
The Angels series is a spin-off involving select couplings of nurses of the corresponding St. Michael's General Hospital. These releases can be identified with a blue coloring.

New Generation series
A series featuring students from the annex school. It can be identified by the color green in the subtitles.

Other spinoffs

Light novels
A light novel series written by Shinichirō Sano and illustrated by Peko is being published by Luminocity. The first volume was released on August 19, 2007, and since then, there have been a total of fourteen volumes released.

Drama CDs
On December 22, 2007, three drama CDs were published, containing stories with the characters from the first six games. On November 27, 2010, a fourth drama CD was announced.

Anime OVA
An anime OVA titled  was produced by ChuChu, directed by Masayuki Sakoi, and was released in Japan on July 30, 2010. Based on the third game, it follows Mai and Reo after they confess their love to one another. To coincide the release of the OVA, the third game was re-released with some improvements and typographical error correction.

References

External links
 Official English site
 Official Fuguriya site 
 Official LUMINOCITY site 
 Official chuchu site 
 
 

2006 video games
2007 Japanese novels
Eroge
Visual novels
Windows games
2010 anime OVAs
Light novels
Video games developed in Japan
Video games featuring female protagonists
Yuri (genre) anime and manga
Yuri (genre) light novels
Yuri (genre) video games
Incest in fiction